Lepthyphantes leprosus is a species of sheetweb spider in the family Linyphiidae. It is found in North America, a range from Europe to eastern Russia, and has been introduced into Chile.

References

External links

 

Linyphiidae
Articles created by Qbugbot
Spiders described in 1865